Freeform's 25 Days of Christmas is an American annual seasonal event of Christmas programming broadcast during the month of December by the U.S. cable network Freeform. The event was first held in 1996, and has been an annual fixture of the channel through its various incarnations, including The Family Channel, Fox Family, ABC Family, and Freeform. The brand covers airings of classic holiday specials as well as new Christmas-themed television movies each year; generally few of the network's original series air during the time period, outside of Christmas-themed episodes. In 2006, the lineup has also included airings of general, family films that Freeform holds rights to, which included the Harry Potter films until January 2017, and other Walt Disney Studios Motion Pictures films. In 2007, the block was extended to November with a Countdown to 25 Days of Christmas block. 25 Days of Christmas programming often attracts major surges in viewership for Freeform, with higher-profile film airings often attracting 3-4 million viewers or more.

For 2017, Disney extended the 25 Days of Christmas branding to holiday programming shown by Freeform's sister properties in the Disney-ABC Television Group, including ABC, Disney Channel, Disney XD, and Disney Junior.

For most of the block's run, fourteen specials from the Rankin/Bass Productions library of Christmas specials (excluding the original Rudolph the Red-Nosed Reindeer and Frosty the Snowman specials, both of which have aired on CBS since 1972 and 1969 respectively) served as the centerpiece of the 25 Days of Christmas. Freeform lost the rights to twelve of those specials (which included The Year Without a Santa Claus) to AMC in 2017 to serve as the linchpin of its new "Best Christmas Ever" schedule; Freeform still airs Santa Claus is Comin' to Town and The Little Drummer Boy. In May 2019, Freeform announced it had acquired the cable rerun rights to the Rudolph and Frosty specials, reuniting the four pre-1974 Rankin/Bass programs on the same network. CBS will continue to hold the free-to-air rerun rights to both specials. Freeform and ABC also held rights to the Charlie Brown holiday specials until Apple TV+ acquired the exclusive rights to the franchise in 2020 (later sublicensing some of the specials to PBS for one-time airings that year).

Programming

Original specials
 1996 – Home and Family Christmas Special
 2001 – Donner
 2008 – A Miser Brothers' Christmas
 2009 – Gotta Catch Santa Claus, Holly and Hal Moose: Our Uplifting Christmas Adventure
 2011 – A Very Pink Christmas
2017 – Disney Parks Presents a Disney Channel Holiday Celebration

Original films
Nearly every year since 25 Days of Christmas debuted in 1996, at least one new holiday-related TV film has been produced (excluding 2002, 2014, and 2015). Starting in 2005, two TV films have been produced. In 2007, three films were created for the block, due to the popularity of the previous year's films.

The Family Channel era: The Family Channel's 25 Days of Christmas
1996 – Christmas Every Day
1997 – The Christmas List

Fox Family era: Fox Family's 25 Days of Christmas
1998 – Like Father, Like Santa
1999 – The Ghosts of Christmas Eve
2000 – Special Delivery
2001 - Three Days

ABC Family era: ABC Family's 25 Days of Christmas
2003 – Picking Up & Dropping Off
2004 – Snow
2005 – Chasing Christmas; Christmas in Boston
2006 – Christmas Do-Over; Santa Baby
2007 – Christmas Caper; Holiday in Handcuffs; Snowglobe
2008 – Christmas in Wonderland; Snow 2: Brain Freeze
2009 – The Dog Who Saved Christmas; Santa Baby 2: Christmas Maybe
2010 – The Dog Who Saved Christmas Vacation; Christmas Cupid; The Gruffalo
2011 – Desperately Seeking Santa; 12 Dates of Christmas
2012 – The Mistle-Tones; Home Alone: The Holiday Heist
2013 – Holidaze, Christmas Bounty

Freeform era: Freeform's 25 Days of Christmas 
2016 – Holiday Joy
2017 – Angry Angel
2018 – Life-Size 2, No Sleep 'Til Christmas, The Truth About Christmas
2019 – Ghosting: The Spirit of Christmas, Same Time, Next Christmas

Current Christmas specials
The following non-original (originally premiered direct to video, or on some other TV network or cable channel, or as a theatrical featurette) Christmas specials (including Kickoff to Christmas and airings on other networks that share the "25 Days..." brand):

A Charlie Brown Christmas
Frosty the Snowman (rights shared with CBS)
How the Grinch Stole Christmas (1966 version) (rights shared with NBC, TBS, and TNT)
Ice Age: A Mammoth Christmas
Kung Fu Panda Holiday
The Little Drummer Boy
Olaf's Frozen Adventure (rights shared with ABC)
Prep & Landing series (rights shared with ABC)
Prep & Landing
Prep & Landing: Naughty vs. Nice
Rudolph the Red-Nosed Reindeer (rights shared with CBS)
Santa Claus Is Comin' to Town (rights shared with ABC)
Toy Story That Time Forgot
The Year Without a Santa Claus (rights shared with AMC, TBS, and TNT)

As of 2019, the only Christmas episodes of a regular series that are featured in the block are from The Simpsons, which Freeform acquired as part of the acquisition of 21st Century Fox by Disney in 2019.

Current Christmas films
The following non-original (originally premiered theatrically, direct to video, or on some other TV network or cable channel) Christmas films are presently being featured during 25 Days of Christmas:
12 Dates of Christmas
A Bad Moms Christmas
A Christmas Carol (2009 version)
Almost Christmas
Arthur Christmas (Shared with TBS, and TNT as of 2022.)
Beauty and the Beast: The Enchanted Christmas
Black Nativity
Call Me Claus
Christmas with the Kranks (Shared with AMC.)
Daddy's Home 2
Deck the Halls (Shared with AMC.)
The First Snow of Winter (US version)
Elf (Shared with AMC, and TBS, and TNT as of 2022.)
Four Christmases (Shared with AMC, TBS and TNT as of 2021)
Fred Claus (Shared with AMC, TBS and TNT as of 2021.)
The Grinch (2018 version)
The Holiday
Holiday in Handcuffs
Home Alone (Shared with AMC)
Home Alone 2: Lost in New York (Shared with AMC)
Home Alone 3
Home Alone 4: Taking Back the House
Home Alone: The Holiday Heist
Home for the Holidays
How the Grinch Stole Christmas (2000 version) (shared with NBC and HBO)
I'll Be Home for Christmas
It's a Very Merry Muppet Christmas Movie
Jingle All the Way (Shared with AMC)
Jingle All the Way 2
Last Christmas
Life-Size 2
Love Actually (shared with AMC)
Love the Coopers (shared with AMC)
The Magic Snowflake
Mickey's Christmas Carol
Mickey's Once Upon a Christmas
Mickey's Twice Upon a Christmas
Miracle on 34th Street (1994 version)
Mister Magoo's Christmas Carol
The Muppet Christmas Carol
My Friends Tigger & Pooh: Super Sleuth Christmas Movie (Shared with Disney Junior)
National Lampoon's Christmas Vacation (Shared with AMC, TBS, and TNT as of 2021.)
The Night Before
The Nightmare Before Christmas
The Nutcracker and the Four Realms
Office Christmas Party
The Perfect Holiday
The Polar Express (Shared with AMC, TBS, and TNT as of 2021.)
Prancer
Prancer Returns
The Preacher's Wife
Rise of the Guardians
Santa's Apprentice
The Santa Clause
The Santa Clause 2
The Santa Clause 3: The Escape Clause
Santa Paws:
Santa Buddies
The Search for Santa Paws
Santa Paws 2: The Santa Pups
Scrooged (shared with AMC)
Snow
Snow 2: Brain Freeze
Snow Day
Snowglobe
The Star
Stealing Christmas
Unaccompanied Minors

Current non-Christmas specials
The Cat in the Hat
A Charlie Brown Thanksgiving
Dr. Seuss on the Loose
The Grinch Grinches the Cat in the Hat
The Hoober-Bloob Highway
The Lorax
Pontoffel Pock, Where Are You?

Current non-Christmas films
The following non-original (originally premiered theatrically, or direct to video, or on some other TV network or cable channel) Non-Christmas films are currently or used to be being featured during 25 Days of Christmas (including Kickoff to Christmas):

A Bug's Life
Aladdin
Alice in Wonderland
Bambi
Beauty and the Beast
Big Hero 6
Bolt
Cars
Cars 2
Cars 3
Chicken Little
Cinderella
Despicable Me
The Emperor's New Groove
Epic
Finding Dory
Finding Nemo
The Fox and the Hound
Frozen
Frozen II
Hercules
The Hunchback of Notre Dame
Ice Age
Ice Age: The Meltdown
Ice Age: Dawn of the Dinosaurs
Ice Age: Continental Drift
Lady and the Tramp
Lilo & Stitch
The Lion King 
The Little Mermaid
Madagascar 
The Many Adventures of Winnie the Pooh
Matilda 
Meet the Robinsons 
Mulan
Oliver & Company
One Hundred and One Dalmatians
The Peanuts Movie
Peter Pan
Pocahontas
The Princess and the Frog
Ralph Breaks the Internet
Ratatouille
The Rescuers
The Rescuers Down Under
Rio
Rio 2
Robots
Shrek
Shrek 2
Tangled
Tarzan
Toy Story
Toy Story 2
Toy Story 3
Toy Story 4
WALL-E
Winnie the Pooh
Wreck-It Ralph
Zootopia

Countdown to 25 Days of Christmas, Kickoff to Christmas and FUNDAY
In 2007, due to popular ratings from the previous year, ABC Family launched the first official countdown to the programming block, which began on November 21. Although this was the first official early start, in previous years holiday programming had unofficially begun during the last week of November, showing mostly older original films, some of which pertained to Christmas and some that did not. Countdown to the 25 Days of Christmas returned in 2008 on November 16. In 2018, Freeform announced that the block would be renamed to Kickoff to Christmas, and would last throughout the whole month of November. This was reprised in 2019.

2011
In 2011, it started later in the month, on November 20. In 2012 the countdown began at an earlier date of November 18.

2014
The Countdown to the 25 Days of Christmas ran again in 2014. In 2014 the countdown event which started on Sunday, November 23 was even with previous years. The highest rated programs of the eight-day event were Finding Nemo at 1.8 million viewers, Despicable Me at 2 million, and an airing of The Hunger Games at 1.7 million. Other highlights included Ratatouille on Thanksgiving night which garnered 1 million, Cars 2 gained 1 million, and Brave which had 1.8 million tune in.

2015
The Countdown to 25 Days of Christmas schedule was released on October 29, 2015. The 2015 lineup included family classics such as Toy Story, Finding Nemo, Jingle All the Way, Monsters, Inc., Ratatouille, The Incredibles, Willy Wonka and the Chocolate Factory, and the cable premiere of Planes. A Monday, November 30 airing of The Polar Express was watched by 1.5 million viewers, the highest rating of this year's Countdown. A Saturday, November 28 airing of Wreck-It Ralph was also watched by 1.5 million viewers. The network premiere of Planes on Thanksgiving night garnered only 0.699 million viewers.

2016
The Countdown to 25 Days of Christmas schedule was released on October 22, 2016. In 2016, Freeform's first Countdown to 25 Days of Christmas ran from Thanksgiving Day, November 24, 2016, to December 25, 2016. The 2016 lineup includes family movies such as Toy Story, Toy Story 2, Toy Story of Terror, Brave, Tangled, Happy Feet Two, Tooth Fairy, Another Cinderella Story, Mulan, Wreck-It Ralph, Matilda, Little Rascals, Willy Wonka and the Chocolate Factory, and Despicable Me. Freeform also announced the network premiere of The Odd Life of Timothy Green, The Boxtrolls, and A Cinderella Story: If the Shoe Fits. The holiday movies in the 2016 Countdown to 25 Days of Christmas included: Fred Claus, The Holiday (Freeform network premiere), Scrooged, Jingle All the Way, National Lampoon's Christmas Vacation, and Deck the Halls.

The 2016 ratings where on par with previous years. The highest airing of the countdown was the November 26th airing of Tangled, gaining 1.461M viewers. Despicable Me gained 1.2M on November 25.

2017
The Countdown to 25 Days of Christmas schedule was released on October 12, 2017. In 2017, Freeform's Countdown to 25 Days of Christmas ran from November 18, 2017, to November 30, 2017. The 2017 lineup included family movies such as The Incredibles, Despicable Me, Harry Potter, Willy Wonka & the Chocolate Factory, Hook, Dennis the Menace, Matilda, Charlie and the Chocolate Factory, and The Boxtrolls. Freeform also announced the network premiere of Inside Out and Snow Day. The holiday movies in the 2017 Countdown to 25 Days of Christmas included: Home Alone, Elf, National Lampoon's Christmas Vacation, Four Christmases (Freeform network premiere), 'Twas the Night Before Christmas, Santa Paws 2: The Santa Pups, Frosty's Winter Wonderland, Jack Frost, The Year Without a Santa Claus, A Christmas Carol, A Dennis the Menace Christmas, Richie Rich's Christmas Wish, Jack Frost, Rudolph and Frosty's Christmas in July, Arthur Christmas, Rudolph's Shiny New Year, Eloise at Christmastime, and The Nightmare Before Christmas.

2018
On May 15, 2018, Freeform announced that the Countdown to 25 Days of Christmas would be renamed Kickoff to Christmas for November 2018. The 2017 Kickoff to Christmas schedule was released on October 10, 2018. The 2018 Kickoff to Christmas lineup runs from November 1 to November 30, 2018, and includes films such as Jumanji, The Good Dinosaur, Inside Out, Norm of the North, Ratatouille, Yogi Bear, Frozen, Babe, Meet the Robinsons, The Incredibles, Toy Story, Storks, Paddington, Zootopia, and others.

2019
As aforementioned, this year marked the first time that the original Rudolph and Frosty specials aired on an American cable television network. Premieres of Fantastic Mr. Fox, Despicable Me 2 and The BFG aired during the month of November.

2020

Ratings

2006
The network premiere of The Polar Express was watched by more than 4 million viewers. An encore airing on December 9 was watched by a record 5 million viewers. It became the most watched programming to ever air on ABC Family. The debut airing of the film, Santa Baby, was watched by 4.7 million viewers.

2007
The first week of programming averaged 2.3 million viewers.

2008
In 2008, the first week of programming attracted 2.7 million total viewers. The entire lineup had an average 2.5 million viewers.

2009
The third annual "Countdown to 25 Days of Christmas" was watched by 1.2 million viewers. The network premiere of The Santa Clause 3 was watched by 1.6 million viewers, while an airing of Harry Potter and the Goblet of Fire was watched by 1.5 million viewers. The premiere of Santa Baby 2: Christmas Maybe was watched by 3.8 million total viewers.

2010
The fourth annual "Countdown to 25 Days of Christmas" was watched by 2.1 million viewers. The lineup began its first week with record breaking 3 million average viewers. The December 12 premiere of Christmas Cupid was watched by a total of 3.4 million viewers. Total viewers for 2010 broke records, averaging 2.8 million viewers. An airing of How the Grinch Stole Christmas drew 1.3 million viewers.

2011
The first week of the 25 Days of Christmas was watched by an average of 2.2 million viewers, down 27% from last year. During the second week, viewers increased to 2.4 million, thanks to the premiere of 12 Dates of Christmas. However, this was still down 30% from the previous year. Overall viewers for the 2011 lineup averaged 2.3 million viewers.

2012
In 2012, the programming block had its most ever total viewers in its debut week, with 2.9 million. An airing of the film Dr. Seuss' How the Grinch Stole Christmas on December 2 became the lineup's most watched program ever, with 5.4 million viewers. Other notable airings included, the network premiere of Despicable Me, watched by over 4.3 million viewers, and a Christmas Eve airing of The Santa Clause 2, watched by 3.9 million viewers. The programming block averaged 2.8 million viewers for 2012, on pace with 2010.

2014
In its 17th year, 25 Days of Christmas powered ABC Family as the top cable network in primetime among women 18–34. The entire line-up averaged 2.5 million viewers. A Friday, December 5 airing of Dr. Seuss' How The Grinch Stole Christmas was watched by 3.7 million. The network premiere of Toy Story That Time Forgot gained 3.4 million while an airing of the classic Toy Story 3 gained 2.7 million viewers. The highest rated airing of Elf gained 3.5 million viewers while the highest rated airing of National Lampoon's Christmas Vacation gained 3.2 million. An airing of the Tim Allen classic The Santa Clause with limited commercials gained 2.9 million viewers.

Christmas Eve ratings on the network saw ratings of The Polar Express at 2.2 million, Home Alone at 2.7 million, and National Lampoon's Christmas Vacation and Elf each at more than 4 million each.

The holiday airings of Pretty Little Liars gained 2 million viewers while Chasing Life gained 1.2 million. The comedies of Melissa and Joey and Baby Daddy gained 1 million and 800,000 viewers respectively.

2015
In 2015 the highest rated event was an airing of Elf on December 5 at 3.7mil, and another airing on December 24 at 3.1mil. Ratings on Christmas Eve were down on the network due to increased competition from other networks. Elf proved once again to draw large audiences. On December 1 The Polar Express gained 2.4mil, an airing of Dr. Seuss' How the Grinch Stole Christmas gained 2.4mil, 2.7mil, and 2.9mil on multiple dates. The highest airing of The Santa Clause was December 2 gaining 2.6mil.

An airing of the Toy Story trilogy on December 13–14 gained 2mil, 2.5mil, and 1.4mil. Christmas Eve on the network was National Lampoon's Christmas Vacation at 2.4mil, and Elf at 3.1mil. Christmas Day was weak, averaging less than 2mil per airing.

2016
The 25 Days of Christmas schedule was released in late October by Freeform. While notable absences include Jim Carrey's How the Grinch Stole Christmas, Home Alone, and the second and third The Santa Clause films, the schedule still includes many classics. The schedule includes 25 days of classics like, Willy Wonka & The Chocolate Factory, National Lampoon's Christmas Vacation, The Santa Clause, Tim Burton's The Nightmare Before Christmas, Jack Frost, Disney's A Christmas Carol, The Polar Express, The Holiday, Elf, Jingle All The Way, Scrooged, Deck the Halls, Toy Story, Frozen, and Happy Feet.

2016 ratings of 25 Days of Christmas were down from previous years. The highest rated airing was December 4, when Elf gained 2.5M viewers. Other airings of Elf gained 2.1M, 1.8M, and 2.0M. A Toy Story marathon on December 10 gained 1.3M, 1.5m, and 1.4m. An airing of Frozen gained 2.3M on December 17.

Christmas Eve on the network saw The Polar Express at 1.4M, The Santa Clause at 1.7M, Elf at 2.7M, and National Lampoon's Christmas Vacation at 2.8M viewers.

2017
Alongside its traditional lineup of acquired and Disney films, the lineup for 2017 included the new original film Angry Angel, starring Jason Biggs and Brenda Song, and the new special Decorating Disney: Holiday Magic, which documented how Disney's theme parks are prepared for the holiday season. On October 31, 2017, it was announced that the 25 Days of Christmas branding would also be used for holiday programming on sister properties ABC (including new seasons of the seasonal miniseries The Great Christmas Light Fight and The Great American Baking Show, as well as its other traditional specials), Disney Channel (including Disney Parks Presents a Disney Channel Holiday Celebration), Disney Junior (including The Lion Guard special "Timon and Pumbaa's Christmas"), and Disney XD (Milo Murphy's Law: "A Christmas Peril", and Star vs. the Forces of Evil: "Stump Day"/"Holiday Spellcial").

Nielsen estimated that at least 150 million viewers watched part of a program on Freeform during the event.

2018
Over the first two weeks after Thanksgiving, average viewership of feature films on Freeform fell by 36% over 2017, due primarily to its loss of several major mainstays of the 25 Days lineup, such as the Harry Potter film series (whose cable rights moved to Syfy and USA Network earlier in the year) as well as various Warner Bros.-owned films and specials (including Elf and National Lampoon's Christmas Vacation, and 12 Rankin/Bass specials) that were acquired by AMC for a competing holiday lineup. The original movie Life-Size 2 (a sequel to a 2000 ABC made-for-TV film, starring Tyra Banks) was seen by 1.26 million viewers.

2019
This year's airing includes The Muppet Christmas Carol as well as the premiere of Prancer Returns, Ghosting: The Spirit of Christmas, Perfect Holiday, Rudolph the Red-Nosed Reindeer, Frosty the Snowman and Same Time, Next Christmas.

2020
This seasonal airing includes It's a Very Merry Muppet Christmas Movie, Christmas with the Kranks, Deck the Halls (2006 film), Snow (2004 film), Snow 2: Brain Freeze, Jingle All the Way 2, and The Preacher's Wife as well as the network's premieres of The Grinch, The Night Before, Almost Christmas, The Star and Black Nativity.

2021

2022
This year's airing includes Kung Fu Panda Holiday and Home Alone 3 as well as the network's premiere of Mr. Magoo's Christmas Carol, Walt Disney Animation Studios' Frozen II and a short film, Olaf's Frozen Adventure.

See also 
31 Nights of Halloween
Best Christmas Ever (program block)

References

External links
 

Freeform (TV channel)
Christmas television specials
Annual television shows
Television programming blocks in the United States
Recurring events established in 1996
1996 American television series debuts